Hylan Boulevard is a major northeast-southwest boulevard in the New York City borough of Staten Island, and the longest street in a single borough in the city. It was renamed in 1923 for New York City mayor John F. Hylan, before which it was known as Southfield Boulevard and the northern segment as Pennsylvania Avenue.

Hylan Boulevard is one of Staten Island's busiest thoroughfares, carrying over 44,000 vehicles per day. The increased volume, built up over decades, has resulted in the road becoming New York City's newest "Boulevard of Death" according to Transportation Alternatives.

Route description
Upon merging again, it becomes Steuben Street, and Hylan Boulevard continues east of there, snaking further through the neighborhood of Arrochar. Half a mile later, Hylan intersects with Old Town Road and Quintard Street, at which point it begins a predominantly straight southwesterly run. Major intersections following include Seaview Avenue (3.2 miles) and Midland Avenue (4.0 miles). At , Hylan intersects with New Dorp Lane at what is known to be one of Staten Island's worst intersections in terms of traffic and collisions. Major intersections include Buffalo Street (6.1 miles) and Nelson Avenue (7.5 miles). At , Hylan intersects with Richmond Avenue, another major Island thoroughfare. Continuing, the last portion of divided roadway ends at Arden Avenue (8.7 miles), and the boulevard continues westward through the neighborhoods of the South Shore, ending at Conference House Park in Tottenville.

Attractions
As an integral artery of Staten Island, Hylan Boulevard is a commercial corridor and a heavily trafficked roadway. At the northernmost end is Buono Beach, a small park with views of New York Harbor, as well as the Alice Austen House (address: 2 Hylan Blvd.), the historical home of native Island photographer Alice Austen and one of the few remaining Dutch Colonial structures on the Island.

Commercial establishments of various kinds line the boulevard's north-central stretch, with larger shopping centers in and around the New Dorp neighborhood. At Buffalo Street is the entrance to Great Kills Park, part of the larger Gateway National Recreation Area. In the neighborhood of Great Kills there are more businesses, but south of Richmond Avenue, the boulevard is almost entirely residential or parkland.

History
The road was part of the Jersey Coast Highway, running from the Staten Island Ferry's St. George Terminal to Cape May, New Jersey.

Transportation
Hylan Boulevard is served by many MTA NYCT bus routes, local and express, including  service to Brooklyn and Manhattan.

While the current Staten Island Railway never crosses Hylan's path, it largely parallels the boulevard. Many stations along the line are half a mile to a mile and a half (one or two km) further inland, with the closest being the Old Town station. The former South Beach Branch of the railway did cross the boulevard just east of Rosebank station.

Major intersections

References

Streets in Staten Island
Boulevards in the United States